Kenneth (Ken) B. Hodges III (born September 22, 1965) is a Judge of the Georgia Court of Appeals and the former Dougherty County District Attorney and was the Democratic nominee for Attorney General of Georgia in 2010. In 2015, Hodges started his own law firm, Ken Hodges Law, based out of Atlanta and Albany. Hodges won an open seat in a contested race on the Georgia Court of Appeals in 2018, earning nearly 70% of the state-wide vote.

Hodges was born and raised in Albany, Georgia and went on to receive his Bachelor of Arts degrees in Political Science and Sociology from Emory University in 1988 and his Juris Doctor degree from the University of Georgia School of Law in 1991. His wife, Melissa, grew up in Gwinnett County and graduated from The Marist School in Atlanta. She earned her bachelor's degree from Saint Mary's College, Notre Dame, Indiana and is a television journalist and currently is a media consultant. The couple was married in 2004 and currently live in Albany, Georgia, with their daughter and son.

Career
After graduating from law school at the University of Georgia, Hodges worked at an Atlanta law firm before returning to his hometown of Albany, Georgia, in 1996 to run a successful campaign for Dougherty County District Attorney. Hodges served as District Attorney for 12 years, gaining re-election in 2000 and 2004.

During his career as lawyer and prosecutor, Hodges has argued in front of the Georgia Court of Appeals and the Georgia Supreme Court. Hodges was instrumental in the 2002 prosecution of Sidney Dorsey, a former DeKalb County Sheriff who ordered the assassination of his successor, Derwin Brown. Ultimately, Dorsey was found guilty on eleven counts, including murder and racketeering, and was sentenced to a term of life without parole.

Ken Hodges also served as President of the Georgia District Attorney's Association and in 2002 was recognized as Georgia's District Attorney of the Year. He has also chaired the Prosecuting Attorney's Council (PAC), and is a Fellow of the Lawyer's Foundation of Georgia.

He is a graduate of Leadership Albany and Leadership Georgia, and was on the board of trustees for Leadership Georgia. He has been listed on Georgia Trend Magazine's "40 under 40" and the Fulton County Daily Report's "Attorneys on the Rise."

Ken Hodges is past Secretary and Board of Trustees member for the Urban League of Atlanta.

In August 2009, as candidate for Georgia Attorney General, Hodges received the endorsement of Andrew Young, former Mayor of Atlanta and United States Ambassador to the United Nations under President Jimmy Carter. Young praised Hodges for "his commitment to equal rights and the fair application of justice during his years of service in Albany."  Hodges has also received the endorsements of former Georgia Supreme Court Chief Justice Leah Ward Sears, the first African-American female Chief Justice in the United States, Mark Taylor, former lieutenant governor of Georgia, and Sam Nunn, former United States Senator from Georgia.

In the Democratic primary, Hodges defeated state Representative Rob Teilhet  In spite of these endorsements, Hodges lost the 2010 general election to Cobb County Commissioner Sam Olens.

In January 2011, Hodges joined the Atlanta law firm Rafuse Hill & Hodges, LLP as a partner in the litigation division.  Rafuse Hill & Hodges had a national litigation practice focusing on employment, civil rights, product liability, and commercial disputes.

In 2013, Hodges was honored by the State Bar of Georgia's Committee to Promote Inclusion in the Profession with the Commitment to Equality Award.  Hodges was selected for the honor because of "his contributions to the advancement of diversity, including his prior service as District Attorney for the Dougherty Judicial Circuit, hiring as his chief assistant the African American prosecutor who later became his successor.  During his three terms, Hodges had one of the most proportionately diverse offices in the state and, in many instances, helped his minority assistants move on to become federal prosecutors or secure positions in private practice. As district attorney, he maintained an internship program with Albany State University, one of Georgia's historical black universities."

In 2013, Hodges was elected by Georgia's attorneys to serve on the executive committee of the State Bar of Georgia.  Hodges currently serves on the board of governors for the State Bar of Georgia, and multiple committees, including the Advisory Committee on Legislation. He was sworn in as President of the State Bar of Georgia in June 2018.
	
In 2013, Hodges was elected by Georgia's attorneys to serve on the executive committee of the State Bar of Georgia.  Hodges currently serves on the board of governors for the State Bar of Georgia, and multiple committees, including the Advisory Committee on Legislation. He was sworn in as president of the State Bar of Georgia in June 2018.

Controversial actions

As district attorney 
As district attorney, he requested a search of a physician's phone records, against the physician—who questioned certain billing practices at the local hospital Phoebe Putney. Hodges was personally sued, successfully, in the same District Court in Albany, but because the case finally impinged on "absolute immunity for grand jurors" the District Court decision went all the way to the Supreme Court of the United States where it was then overturned.

As attorney and judge-elect 
In an ongoing action in the Dougherty County Superior Court (where Hodges was DA), the plaintiff claimed that Hodges was appointed improperly as the receiver of an apartment complex called Gardens on Whispering Pines, and also acted improperly because he had previously served as attorney facilitating the sale of the real estate in question. Subsequently James B. Holloway filed an appeal against Hodges  in the same Court where Hodges won the election to replace the judge.

Hodges has been accused of ethical violations and is being sued for millions of dollars in the Dougherty County Superior Court. (17-cv-1456). The plaintiffs allege that Hodges communicated with Judge Willie Lockette to improperly place the apt complex into receivership, and then denied under oath to Senior Judge L. A. McConnell that he had no professional or personal dealings with a Stephen Bacon in the matter. Additionally he has been accused of calling the Judicial Qualifications Commission (JQC) in the selection of judges who might rule favorably in the case.

References

1965 births
Living people
District attorneys in Georgia (U.S. state)
Georgia (U.S. state) state court judges
Georgia (U.S. state) Democrats
Emory University alumni
People from Albany, Georgia